Tom Dillehay is an American anthropologist who is the Rebecca Webb Wilson University Distinguished Professor of Anthropology, Religion, and Culture and Professor of Anthropology at Vanderbilt University. In addition to Vanderbilt, Dillehay has taught at the Universidad Austral de Chile and the University of Kentucky.  Since 1977, Dillehay has been involved in the excavations at Monte Verde in Chile, where an early human settlement was found in 1975. Dillehay claims that the remains are about 14,800 years old according to the calibrated dates of carbon 14. The data suggest that people might have been in South America before 15,000 years ago and challenging the Clovis theory of the first human arrival in the Americas.

In addition to his archaeological work, Dillehay has conducted ethnographic work among the Mapuche of southern Chile and the Jívaro of northern Peru.

Publications

References

External links
 Anthropology in Universidad Austral
 Vanderbilt University Anthropology Department
 
 About Tom Dillehay at The Archaeology Channel

American anthropologists
Anthropology educators
Vanderbilt University faculty
Living people
Year of birth missing (living people)
Academic staff of the Austral University of Chile
Historians of the Mapuche world